In mathematics, the Cauchy–Kovalevskaya theorem (also written as the Cauchy–Kowalevski theorem) is the main local existence and uniqueness theorem for analytic partial differential equations associated with Cauchy initial value problems.

First order Cauchy–Kovalevskaya theorem
This theorem is about the existence of solutions to a system of m differential equations in n dimensions when the coefficients are analytic functions. The theorem and its proof are valid for analytic functions of either real or complex variables.

Let K denote either the fields of real or complex numbers, and let V = Km and W = Kn. Let A1, ..., An−1 be analytic functions defined on some neighbourhood of (0, 0) in W × V and taking values in the m × m matrices, and let b be an analytic function with values in V defined on the same neighbourhood. Then there is a neighbourhood of 0 in W on which the quasilinear Cauchy problem

with initial condition

on the hypersurface

has a unique analytic solution ƒ : W → V near 0.

Lewy's example shows that the theorem is not more generally valid for all smooth functions.

The theorem can also be stated in abstract (real or complex) vector spaces. Let V and W be finite-dimensional real or complex vector spaces, with n = dim W. Let A1, ..., An−1 be analytic functions with values in End (V) and b an analytic function with values in V, defined on some neighbourhood of (0, 0) in W × V. In this case, the same result holds.

Proof by analytic majorization
Both sides of the partial differential equation can be expanded as formal power series and give recurrence relations for the coefficients of the formal power series for f that uniquely determine the coefficients. The Taylor series coefficients of the Ai's and b are majorized in matrix and vector norm by a simple scalar rational analytic function. The corresponding scalar Cauchy problem involving this function instead of the Ai's and b has an explicit local analytic solution. The absolute values of its coefficients majorize the norms of those of the original problem; so the formal power series solution must converge
where the scalar solution converges.

Higher-order Cauchy–Kovalevskaya theorem
If F and fj are analytic functions near 0, then the non-linear Cauchy problem

with initial conditions

has a unique analytic solution near 0.

This follows from the first order problem by considering the derivatives of h appearing on the right hand side as components of a vector-valued function.

Example
The heat equation

with the condition

has a unique formal power series solution (expanded around (0, 0)). However this formal power series does not converge for any non-zero values of t, so there are no analytic solutions in a neighborhood of the origin. This shows that the condition |α| + j ≤ k above cannot be dropped.  (This example is due to Kowalevski.)

Cauchy–Kovalevskaya–Kashiwara theorem

There is a wide generalization of the Cauchy–Kovalevskaya theorem for systems of linear partial differential equations with analytic coefficients, the Cauchy–Kovalevskaya–Kashiwara theorem, due to
. This theorem involves a cohomological formulation, presented in the language of D-modules. The existence condition involves a compatibility condition among the non homogeneous parts of each equation and the vanishing of a derived functor .

Example
Let . Set . The system  has a solution  if and only if the compatibility conditions   are verified. In order to have a unique solution we must include an initial condition  , where .

References
 Reprinted in Oeuvres completes, 1 serie, Tome VII, pages 17–58.

 (linear case)

 (German spelling of her surname used at that time.)

External links
PlanetMath

Augustin-Louis Cauchy
Partial differential equations
Theorems in analysis
Uniqueness theorems